Adûnaic (or Adunaic) ("language of the West") is one of the fictional languages devised by J. R. R. Tolkien for his fantasy works.

One of the languages of Arda in Tolkien's Middle-earth legendarium, Adûnaic was spoken by the Men of Númenor during the Second Age.

Fictional history

Adûnaic was the language of Númenor, and after its destruction in the Akallabêth, the "native speech" of the people of Elendil in the kingdoms of Arnor and Gondor in the west of Middle-earth, though they usually spoke Sindarin. By the time of the War of the Ring, it had developed into the common speech or Westron. Tolkien called Adûnaic "the language of the culturally and politically influential Númenóreans."

Concept and creation

Although Tolkien created very few original words in Adûnaic, mostly names, the language serves his concept as the ancestor of a lingua franca for Middle-earth, Westron, a shared language for many different peoples.

Tolkien devised Adûnaic (or Númenórean), the language spoken in Númenor, shortly after World War II, and thus at about the time he completed The Lord of the Rings, but before he wrote the linguistic background information of the Appendices. Adûnaic is intended as the language from which Westron (also called Adûni) is derived.
This added a depth of historical development to the Mannish languages. Adûnaic was intended to have a "faintly Semitic flavour". Its development began with his 1945 work The Notion Club Papers. It is there that the most extensive sample of the language is found, revealed to one of the (modern-day) protagonists, Lowdham, in a visionary dream of Atlantis. Its grammar is sketched in the unfinished "Lowdham's Report on the Adunaic Language", included in Sauron Defeated.
 
Tolkien remained undecided whether the language of the Men of Númenor should be derived from the original Mannish language (as in Adûnaic), or if it should be derived from  "the Elvish Noldorin" (i.e. Quenya) instead. In The Lost Road and Other Writings it is implied that the Númenóreans spoke Quenya, and that Sauron, hating all things Elvish, taught the Númenóreans the old Mannish tongue they themselves had forgotten.

Phonology

The phonology is as follows:

{| class="wikitable" style="text-align: center"
!  
! Labial
! Dental
! Alveolar
! Palatal
! Velar
! Glottal
|-
! Occlusive
|  
|
|  
|
|  
|
|-
! Fricative
| 
| 
|  
|
| 
| 
|-
! Nasal
| 
|
| 
|
| 
|
|-
! Trill
|
|
| 
|
|
|
|-
! Approximant
|
|
| 
| 
| 
|
|}

{| class="wikitable" style="text-align: center;"
|-
!
!Front
!Back
|-
! Close
|| || 
|-
! Close-mid
||1||1
|-
! Open
|colspan=2| 
|}

Grammar 
Most information about Adûnaic grammar comes from an incomplete typescript Lowdham's Report on the Adûnaic Language, written by Tolkien to accompany The Notion Club Papers. The report discusses phonology and morphological processes in some detail, and starts to discuss nouns, but breaks off before saying much about verbs, other parts of speech or the grammar as a whole. It appears that Tolkien abandoned work on the language after writing this portion of the Report, and never returned to it.

Nouns 

Most nouns are triconsonantal, but there are a number of biconsonantal nouns as well. Nouns can be divided into three declensions, called Strong I, Strong II and Weak. The two strong declensions form their various cases by modifying the last vowel, similarly to English man/men. The weak declension forms its cases by appending a suffix.

There are three numbers, singular, plural and dual. Dual is used mainly for "natural pairs", like eyes and shoes. There are three cases, Normal, Subjective and Objective. The Subjective case is used as the subject of a verb. The Objective case is used only in compound expressions and appears only in the singular. The Normal case is used in all other circumstances, such as the object of a verb.

Example declensions:

Sample Text
This Adûnaic text, part of the tale of the Fall of Numenor, appears in The Notion Club Papers. It is fragmentary because it appeared in a dream to the character Lowdham, and is only partially translated by him because he did not know the language. Words in bold are not translated at the point in the text where the translation is first given, but their translation is given later in the story.

References

External links

 
 Andreas Moehn – Lalaith's Guide to Adûnaic Grammar
 Thorsten Renk's Ni-bitha Adûnâyê
 Adûnaic from Almavarno in Italian

Middle-earth languages
Constructed languages